Tomo Zdelarić (c. 1531 – 8 April 1572) was the earliest Jesuit from Habsburg Kingdom of Slavonia. According to Vanino, Zdelarić also referred to himself as Illyrus.

Zdelarić was born in Lupoglav, Dugo Selo around 1531. Zdelarić became a Jesuit in 1554. He was lecturer of the philosophy at the Jesuit college in Vilnius.

Zdelaric died in Vilnius on 8 April 1572 in a plague.

References

Sources 

 
 
 
 

1531 births
1572 deaths
16th-century Jesuits
Academic staff of Vilnius University